Pepe is a pet form of the Spanish name José (Josep). It is also a surname.

People

Mononyms
Pepe (footballer, born 1935), real name José Macia, Brazilian footballer
Pepe (footballer, born 1983), real name Képler Laveran Lima Ferreira, Brazilian-born Portuguese footballer
Pepe (footballer, born October 1983), real name Marcos Paulo Aguiar de Jesus, Brazilian footballer
Pepê (footballer, born 1997), real name Eduardo Gabriel Aquino Cossa, Brazilian footballer
Pepê (footballer, born 1998), real name João Pedro Vilardi Pinto, Brazilian footballer

Politicians
Porfirio Lobo Sosa (born 1947), known as Pepe, candidate for the Presidency of Honduras
José Mujica (born 1935), known as El Pepe, president of Uruguay
José Gregorio Liendo (1945–1973), known as "comandante Pepe", "compañero Pepe", or "loco Pepe", Chilean political activist
José Rizal (1861–1896), Filipino nationalist

Musicians
Pepe Romero (born 1944), Spanish classical and flamenco guitarist
Pepe Aguilar (born 1968), American folklore singer
Pépé Kallé (1951–1998), Congolese Soukous singer
Pepe Smith (1947-2019), real name Joseph William Feliciano Smith, Filipino rock singer and drummer

Sportsmen
Pepe Frías  (born 1948), Puerto Rican MLB player
Pepe Pearson (born 1975), American football player
Pepe Reina (born 1982), Spanish footballer
Juan Ignacio Sánchez known as Pepe Sánchez (born 1977), Argentine basketball player
Pepe Soares (1908–1931), real name José Manuel Soares, Portuguese footballer

Surname
Cécé Pepe (born 1996), French footballer
Florestano Pepe (1778–1851), Italian soldier, brother of Guglielmo
Gabriele Pepe (1779–1849), Italian soldier, cousin of Guglielmo
Guglielmo Pepe (1783–1855), Italian general
Nico Pepe (1917–1987), Italian actor
Nicolas Pépé (born 1995), French-Ivorian footballer
Osman Pepe (born 1954), Turkish politician
Simone Pepe (born 1983), Italian footballer
Vincenzo Pepe (born 1987), Italian footballer

Fictional characters
Pepe el Toro, main character in the series of films Nosotros los Pobres, Ustedes los Ricos and Pepe el Toro
Pepé Le Pew, in the Warner Bros. Looney Tunes and Merrie Melodies series of cartoons
Justin Vincenzo Pepé Russo and Geraldo Pepé Russo, characters from the TV series Wizards of Waverly Place
Pepe (Shugo Chara!), in the manga series Shugo Chara!
Pepe, from Unseen Academicals by Terry Pratchett
Pepe the Frog, Internet meme from the comic series Boy's Club
Pepe the King Prawn, a Muppet character
Pepe Waccabrada, from  the anime Bleach by Tite Kubo
Pépé Torres the young killer in John Steinbeck's short story Flight (Steinbeck story) 1938
Pericles, nicknamed Pepe, character in Asterix in Spain by René Goscinny.

See also
 Pepa (disambiguation), the feminine form of the Spanish nickname
 Pepito (disambiguation), diminutive name for Pepe in Spanish culture
 Peppe, a given name, nickname and surname

Spanish-language hypocorisms
Italian-language surnames